Pomaderris brevifolia is a species of flowering plant in the family Rhamnaceae and is endemic to the south of Western Australia. It is a slender shrub with silky-hairy young branchlets, wedge-shaped, heart-shaped or egg-shaped leaves with the narrower end towards the base, and clusters of ten to twenty cream-coloured to pale pink flowers.

Description
Flowering mainly occurs from January to August.

Taxonomy
Pomaderris brevifolia was first formally described in 1994 by Neville Grant Walsh in the journal Muelleria from specimens collected by Alex George in 1970. The specific epithet (brevifolia) means "small leaves", since this species has the smallest leaves of any Western Australian pomaderris.

Distribution and habitat
This pomaderris grows in mallee scrub and heath, often between rocks, usually in sheltered places, mainly from near Bluff Knoll to Israelite Bay in the Esperance Plains and Mallee biogeographic regions in the south of Western Australia.

Conservation status
Pomaderris brevifolia is listed as "not threatened" by the Government of Western Australia Department of Biodiversity, Conservation and Attractions.

References

brevifolia
Flora of Western Australia
Plants described in 1994